Roxanne Marie "Roxy" LeBlanc (née Brooks) is a fictional character on the Lifetime television series Army Wives, played by Sally Pressman. She is married to 2LT Trevor LeBlanc. She has two sons. T.J. and Finn are from two separate previous relationships (an abusive husband named Jesse, and a boyfriend named Whit), and were legally adopted by Trevor. She then had twins with Trevor, Wyatt and Drew, who were born in the sixth season.

Background
A native of Tuscaloosa, Alabama, Roxy was raised by a single mother and, by her own account, never knew her biological father. Her mother Marda tells Trevor in Season 1 that Roxy's father died when Roxy was five but never clarified whether he was her biological father or not. Marda was an alcoholic and a hair stylist who married two more times and had a string of relationships with various men. At age seventeen Roxy became pregnant by her high school sweetheart Jesse and dropped out to marry him and work. Jesse started drinking and became abusive. She left him after he punched her when she was six months pregnant with TJ. Several years later she began a relationship with childhood friend Whit and they had a son Finn, but never married. For some time she lived in a trailer on food stamps and welfare. Roxy eventually fulfills her lifelong goal of finishing high school when she passes her GED exam with Roland's help in Season 2.

Roxy has a love-hate relationship with her mother due to a difficult childhood and her mother's drinking. It is revealed that she never mentioned Marda when she accepted Trevor's marriage proposal. At times Trevor inadvertently found himself in between mother and daughter and has tried, albeit unsuccessfully at first, to mend their relationship.

Storylines
In the pilot episode PFC Trevor LeBlanc made the trip west to Tuscaloosa from Fort Marshall in Charleston, South Carolina to propose to her, the two having only started dating four days earlier. She accepts and moves to his post with her two sons. Initially she felt out of place and uncomfortable with the military protocol and decorum. During her first division banquet she meets fellow Army spouses Claudia Joy Holden, Denise Sherwood and Dr. Roland Burton and is invited to a tea party hosted by Claudia Joy, who then introduces her to Pamela Moran. The five of them bond despite their very different individual backgrounds. She is best friends with Pamela as they used to live several blocks from one another and their children are of similar age. She sees Claudia Joy and Denise as "older sister" figures and often sought their advice, especially regarding marital issues.

At Trevor's persuasion to "get out" and make new friends, Roxy accepts the invitation of several wives to go to The Hump Bar, a favorite haunt of service personnel and locals. To her horror, she realizes that the wives were there to hit on civilian men while their husbands were deployed. Seeing a "helped wanted" sign, she gets a job as a bartender there. She befriends the deadpan owner Betty Camden and becomes a surrogate daughter to her. Despite a noticeable lack of business savvy, her street sense more than compensates. When Betty dies, Roxy briefly renames the bar "Betty's Place," but has since changed it back to the Hump Bar.

During the first season Roxy is forced to quickly adapt to life at Fort Marshall and her role as an Army wife. Her naivete was often a source of comedy in the show. For example, she personally pleads with Trevor's platoon sergeant SFC Hendrix in front of the entire platoon to spare him for the day after learning that he has blisters on his foot; this backfires as Trevor was mercilessly teased about the incident by SFC Hendrix and his platoon mates for the rest of the exercise and given the demeaning nickname "Baby Soft". During her first divisional banquet she salutes a bemused Major Frank Sherwood when he was notifying Trevor about being accepted into jump school. In Season 5 she talks the housing officer into reviewing hers and Trevor's housing situation by using his rank and her friendship with Claudia Joy Holden, much to Trevor's embarrassment.

In Season 3 Trevor brings home Lucky, a dog Jeremy Sherwood managed to smuggle out of Iraq with the help of friends. Roxy is initially furious, especially after Lucky accidentally runs past and bumps into her and while she was trimming her hair, causing her to snip off a significant portion. She relents after seeing how the boys enjoyed having a pet. Lucky also became a welcome distraction for her and the boys when she suffered a miscarriage in Season 4 and while Trevor was deployed in from the latter part of Season 4 to the beginning of Season 5. Trevor's second deployment proves to more difficult for Roxy due to Jeremy's death and TJ's rebellious streak.

In Season 5, Whit, Finn's biological father, visits to give some money from a small inheritance toward Finn's education. Roxy subsequently hires Whit to work as a contractor on a truck stop business project. With Trevor away in Afghanistan, she begins to feel close to her old flame again, though she resists acting on it. Roxy finds out Trevor is coming home early. She panics and tries to fire Whit, much to the chagrin of her business partner. However Trevor is noticeably distant and avoids her for over a week. They eventually talk out their differences and reconcile. She admits to Trevor that the truck stop project was motivated by her fear of hers and the boys' future should Trevor be killed in action after learning that he was just several feet away from where Jeremy was killed.

With Trevor's promotion to Second Lieutenant in season 6, they move to a bigger house and Roxy becomes the FRG leader for his company. As FRG leader she befriends and helps new Army wives adjust to life at Fort Marshall. Roxy also finds out that she is pregnant with twins. She and Trevor spend a weekend with Pamela and Chase in Miami and Trevor is offered a job by Chase at his security firm. Roxy tries to persuade Trevor into taking up the offer but he refuses and it causes tension between them. Her mother Marda visits them during this time, only to find herself in the middle of a "cold war" between Roxy and Trevor. Roxy confesses that she hoped Trevor would leave the Army so that she would not have to constantly worry about him and his deployments. Before her departure Marda sternly reminds Roxy of what her life what was like before meeting Trevor and that the fact that Trevor truly loves her and the boys should be what matters most.

In the 100th episode Roxy gives birth to twin boys, Wyatt and Drew. Wyatt is born vaginally, without complications but cord is wrapped around Drew's neck and Roxy has to have an emergency cesarean section. Drew had to be put into an incubator while Roxy gets to take Wyatt home. Not long after, Drew finally gets to go home.

At the conclusion of the season, the family moves to Tacoma, Washington when Trevor is "PCS-ed" to Fort Lewis. She continues to own the Hump Bar, but leaves the day-to-day operations to Gloria Cruz, who is now the manager.

In Season 7 Roxy briefly returns to visit Fort Marshall with the twins to attend Claudia Joy's funeral. She had been on a road trip with Trevor and the boys and took a detour to Charleston after learning about Claudia Joy's death.

Characterization
Roxy is known as one of the more outspoken and honest of the wives. In the Season 1 episode "Nobody's Perfect" she tells Trevor that she "gets jealous easily" and tends to speak her mind. In Seasons 2 and 3 she stepped in when a flirtatious customer and waitress tried to flirt with her husband, although Trevor displayed no interest in their overtures.

Sally Pressman said of Roxy: "She's so much fun, she's so honest, she's so loving, and I also love when she sticks her foot in her mouth all the time. And I like that she doesn't take anyone's crap but she's a really good person at the same time." She added that "the nitty gritty, southern, no-frills bar" is what really represents her. The New Zealand Herald described Roxy as "a slapper with a heart of gold." 
She was loyal and was always the strong one.

Reception
The Chicago Tribune named Roxy "the most problematic character" because she does "preposterous and downright stupid things" in the first episodes. However, Rob Owen of Pittsburgh Post-Gazette deemed her and Trevor "the liveliest couple", adding the show "sparks to life anytime these two are on screen."

See also
List of fictional supercouples
Quotes

References

External links
 Roxy LeBlanc at Lifetime

Army Wives characters
Fictional bartenders
Fictional characters from Alabama
Television characters introduced in 2007
American female characters in television
ka:ჰეილი ჯეიმს სკოტი
sr:Хејли Џејмс-Скот